The Deodoro Line was a commuter rail line operated by SuperVia before being interconnected to the Santa Cruz Line in June 2020.

History
The busiest line in the SuperVia system was the one that operated between Central do Brasil and the neighbourhood of Deodoro, at the border between the North and West Sides of Rio. This line crossed many important neighbourhoods of the North Side, such as Praça da Bandeira, São Cristóvão, Maracanã, Méier, Engenho de Dentro, Piedade, Cascadura, Madureira, Oswaldo Cruz, Rio de Janeiro, Bento Ribeiro and Marechal Hermes. 

Popularly known as parador (local service), it had a journey time of 40 minutes.

Some of its main stations, such as Méier and Madureira, had escalators installed and others, such as Cascadura, Piedade and Quintino, were restored.

In 2006, after more than two decades without acquisition of new rolling stock, new Series 2005 compositions from South Korea began operating, in a total of 20 new trains which began operation in mid-2007 for the 2007 Pan American Games. This line connects Nilton Santos Olympic Stadium, in Engenho de Dentro, to Maracanã Stadium, two of the main centers of the event. In 2012, 30 new Series 3000 compositions from Changchun, China began operating.

It had integration with bus lines from the city in Méier, Cascadura, Madureira, Marechal Hermes and Deodoro stations, exclusively using the RioCard. From Central do Brasil towards Deodoro, there are bus lines with integration to Catumbi and Rio Comprido neighbourhoods.

During peak hours, the headway on the Deodoro Line was 6−8 minutes. For interchange stations, where there are also express services, the headway was only 3 minutes.

The line was integrated with the Santa Cruz Line in June 2020, becoming part of the line. This decision was taken by SuperVia to reduce delays caused by the signalling of the Deodoro, Santa Cruz and Japeri lines.

Specifications
The Deodoro Line was electrified through overhead lines of 3,000 Volts, and had a rolling stock composed of Hyundai Rotem Series 2005 and CNR Series 3000.

Stations
The line had 19 stations along its route and passed by several abandoned stations such as Todos os Santos, Rocha and Encantado.

See also
 SuperVia

References

External links
 SuperVia official website

Railway lines in Brazil